History of telegraph may refer to:
History of telegraphy in general
History of the electrical telegraph or history of wireless telegraphy in particular